The Hardeman Barns, in Wilson in Teton County, Wyoming, were listed on the National Register of Historic Places in 2015.

The main barn has a Gothic arch shape, and was designed and built by Wesley Bircher.

It was the subject of a film by Jennifer Tennican available at Vimeo.

The barns with 27 acres property were sold to the Teton Raptor Center in 2017.

References

External links
Vimeo movie

National Register of Historic Places in Teton County, Wyoming
Barns on the National Register of Historic Places in Wyoming
Buildings and structures in Teton County, Wyoming